Modern agriculture may refer to:

Agribusiness
Intensive farming
Organic farming
Precision agriculture
Sustainable agriculture